The Phillips Berlina is a neo-classic car built in Pompano Beach, Florida. Debuting in 1980, it was designed by Charles W. Phillips in the style of the 1936 Mercedes-Benz 540K Special Roadster. It used stretched C3 Chevrolet Corvette underpinnings, coupled to fibreglass bodywork. As for the Corvette, power steering and brakes, powered tinted windows, and tilt steering were fitted. The earlier carburetted version (L81) had 190 hp on tap. By 1982, a special "Coupé SE" version was also available.

See also
Excalibur
Clénet
Zimmer
Stutz Blackhawk

References

Defunct motor vehicle manufacturers of the United States
Retro-style automobiles

Cars introduced in 1980
Cars discontinued in 1983